The Pan American Judo Championships were held in San Salvador, El Salvador from 8 April to 11 April 2010.

Medals table

Results

Men's events

Women's events

External links
 
 Live results from Judo-World

American Championships
Pan American Judo Championships
2010
Judo competitions in El Salvador
International sports competitions hosted by El Salvador